Abdelouahed Idrissi Chorfi (born 1 January 1969) is a Moroccan judoka.  He competed at the 1996 Olympics as an extra-lightweight, coming seventeenth.

Achievements

References

1969 births
Living people
Moroccan male judoka
Judoka at the 1996 Summer Olympics
Judoka at the 2000 Summer Olympics
Olympic judoka of Morocco
Mediterranean Games bronze medalists for Morocco
Mediterranean Games medalists in judo
Competitors at the 1993 Mediterranean Games
Competitors at the 2001 Mediterranean Games
20th-century Moroccan people
21st-century Moroccan people
African Games medalists in judo
Competitors at the 2003 All-Africa Games
African Games silver medalists for Morocco